Colin Reilly (born 4 September 1982, in Bellshill) is an English professional footballer who plays as a midfielder.

Career
Reilly began his professional career with Dundee United but failed to make an appearance and was released in April 2002. Reilly went on trial with Morton in July 2002 and signed for them shortly afterwards. In Reilly's third match, he was involved in a "knee-high" tackle which saw him seriously injure former Dundee United teammate Sean O'Connor, earning a red card in the process. Reilly played just another four matches, with his final appearance coming in November 2002. After leaving Morton, Reilly moved to South Africa.

References

External links

 (Morton details with incorrect spelling)

1982 births
Living people
Footballers from Bellshill
Scottish footballers
Scottish Football League players
Dundee United F.C. players
Greenock Morton F.C. players
Association football midfielders